Old Glory is a ghost town in Santa Cruz County, Arizona, in the United States.

References

External links
 Old Glory – ghosttowns.com
 Old Glory – Ghost Town of the Month at azghosttowns.com

Populated places in Santa Cruz County, Arizona
Ghost towns in Arizona